In automobiles (and other wheeled vehicles which have two wheels on an axle), the axle track is the distance between the hub flanges on an axle. Wheel track, track width or simply track refers to the distance between the centerline of two wheels on the same axle. In the case of an axle with dual wheels, the centerline of the dual wheel assembly is used for the wheel track specification. Axle and wheel track are commonly measured in millimetres or inches.

Common usage
Despite their distinct definitions, axle track, (not to be frequently and incorrectly used interchangeably as wheel track and track width), normally to refer to the distance between the centerline of the wheels. For a vehicle with two axles, the measurements can be expressed as front track and rear track. For a vehicle with more than two axles, the axles are normally numbered for reference.

Offset wheels
In vehicles with offset wheels, wheel track is distinct from axle track because the centreline of the wheel is not flush with the hub flange. If wheels of a different offset are fitted, the wheel track changes but the axle track does not.

Rail
In the case of a rail wheelset the axle track is called wheel gauge and is measured from wheel flange reference line to wheel flange reference line on the wheels of a rail car or tram axle. The wheel gauge of a rail vehicle must be compatible with the track gauge of the network it runs on.

Model rail
Model railway elements such as track, rolling stock and locomotives are categorised by their wheel or track gauge. An OO gauge model locomotive, for example, has a wheel gauge of 16.5mm.

See also
 Track gauge – determines the distance between the reference lines of the rails
 Wheelbase – the distance between the front and rear axles
 Wheelset

References 

Automotive engineering
Track gauges
Train wheels